Xiangli Bin (born March 1967) is a Chinese research professor at the Institute of Optoelectronics, Chinese Academy of Sciences (CAS). He has served as a vice-president of the CAS since 2016. He is a member of the Chinese Society for Optical Engineering (CSOE) and Chinese Optical Society (COS), and an academician of the CAS.

Education
Xiangli was born in Xi'an, Shaanxi, China in March 1967, while his ancestral home in Wanrong County, Shanxi. He earned his bachelor's degree from the University of Science and Technology of China in July 1990, and doctor's degree from the Xi'an Institute of Optics and Precision Mechanics, Chinese Academy of Sciences (CAS) in June 1995. Then he was a postdoctoral fellow at Northwest University.

Career
In February 1998 he was assigned to the Xi'an Institute of Optics and Precision Mechanics, Chinese Academy of Sciences, serving until February 2005. From March 2005 to September 2006 he successively served as deputy director and director of the Bureau of High Technology Research and Development, Chinese Academy of Sciences. In September 2006 he was promoted to become dean of Xi'an Branch of Chinese Academy of Sciences, and held that office until June 2008. He became president of Institute of Optoelectronics, Chinese Academy of Sciences in July 2008, and served until October 2013. He was director of Innovation Academy for Microsatellites, Chinese Academy of Sciences in September 2009, serving until May 2016. In 2015, he was appointed general director of Beidou Navigation Satellite System (BDS). In April 2016 he was named vice-president of Chinese Academy of Sciences (CAS).

He was a delegate to the 11th and 12th National People's Congress. In October 2017 he became a delegate to the 19th National Congress of the Communist Party of China.

Honours and awards
 Fellow of the Society of Photo-Optical Instrumentation Engineers (SPIE)
 2013 State Science and Technology Award (Second Class)
 2015 State Science and Technology Award (Special Award)
 November 6, 2018 Science and Technology Award of the Ho Leung Ho Lee Foundation
 November 22, 2019 Member of the Chinese Academy of Sciences (CAS)

References

1967 births
Living people
Politicians from Xi'an
University of Science and Technology of China alumni
Northwest University (China) alumni
Scientists from Shaanxi
Members of the Chinese Academy of Sciences
Delegates to the 11th National People's Congress
Delegates to the 12th National People's Congress
People's Republic of China politicians from Shaanxi
Chinese Communist Party politicians from Shaanxi